The California Health and Human Services Agency (CHHS) is the state agency tasked with administration and oversight of "state and federal programs for health care, social services, public assistance and rehabilitation" in the U.S. state of California. The agency is headed by the Secretary of the California Health and Human Services Agency, with headquarters in Sacramento. Many of the laws in the California Health and Safety Codes are enforced by it.

On March 6, 2019, Governor Gavin Newsom nominated Mark Ghaly, MD, MPH to be Secretary of CHHS. The California State Senate unanimously confirmed Ghaly on June 17, 2019. Ghaly previously served as the director of health and social impact for Los Angeles County, deputy director of the Los Angeles County Department of Health Services, and medical director of the San Francisco Department of Public Health’s Southeast Health Center. Ghaly earned his doctorate of medicine degree from Harvard Medical School and a master of public health degree from the Harvard T.H. Chan School of Public Health.

CHHS was created from a reorganization of other California agencies, including the California Health and Welfare Agency which included the California Department of Health Services.

Organization 
The agency is divided into various departments and boards:

 California Department of Aging
 California Department of Child Support Services
 California Department of Community Services and Development
 California Department of Developmental Services
 California Emergency Medical Services Authority
 California Department of Health Care Services
 California Department of Managed Health Care
 California Managed Risk Medical Insurance Board
 California Department of Public Health
 California Department of Rehabilitation
 California Department of Social Services
 California Department of State Hospitals
 CONREP
 California Office of Statewide Health Planning and Development
 California Office of Health Information Integrity (CalOHII)
 California Office of Law Enforcement Support
 California Office of the Patient Advocate - originally created in 2000, it conducts consumer education, provides quality of care scorecards, and reports on consumer questions and complaints
 California Office of Systems Integration
 Office of the California Surgeon General

History 
The agency was originally created in 1961 by Government Code section 12800 as the Human Relations Agency, and renamed to the Health and Welfare Agency in 1972 to and again to its current name in 1998.

References

External links 
 

Health and Human Services Agency
State departments of health of the United States
Medical and health organizations based in California